Erna (minor planet designation: 406 Erna), provisional designation , is a dark asteroid of the background population in the outer regions of the asteroid belt, approximately 46 kilometers in diameter. It was discovered by French astronomer Auguste Charlois at Nice Observatory on 22 August 1895. The asteroid was presumably named after Erna Bidschof, the granddaughter of Johann Palisa.

Orbit and classification 

Erna is a non-family asteroid from the main belt's background population. It orbits the Sun in the outer asteroid belt at a distance of 2.4–3.4 AU once every 4 years and 12 months (1,818 days). Its orbit has an eccentricity of 0.18 and an inclination of 4° with respect to the ecliptic. The body's observation arc begins at the United States Naval Observatory in September 1905, more than 10 years after its official discovery observation at Nice.

Physical characteristics 

In the Tholen classification, Erna is a dark and primitive P-type asteroid. It has also been characterized as such by polarimetric observations.

Rotation period 

In October 2005, a rotational lightcurve of Erna was obtained from photometric observations by French and Italian astronomers Raymond Poncy, Roberto Crippa, Federico Manzini and Silvano Casulli. Lightcurve analysis gave a well-defined rotation period of 8.7893 hours with a brightness variation of 0.35 magnitude. Another lightcurve from the Palomar Transient Factory in November 2010 gave a similar period of 8.790 hours with an amplitude of 0.35 magnitude.

Spin axis 

In 2013, an international study modeled a lightcurve from various data sources including the Uppsala Asteroid Photometric Catalogue and the Palomar Transient Factory survey. The modeling gave a concurring period of 8.79079 hours and determined two spin axis in ecliptic coordinates (λ, β) of: (357.0°, −49.0°) and (161.0°, −60.0°).

Diameter and albedo 

According to the surveys carried out by the Infrared Astronomical Satellite IRAS, the Japanese Akari satellite, and NASA's Wide-field Infrared Survey Explorer with its subsequent NEOWISE mission, Erna measures between 41.52 and 49.19 kilometers in diameter and its surface has an albedo between 0.0524 and 0.060.

The Collaborative Asteroid Lightcurve Link adopts the results obtained by IRAS, that is, an albedo of 0.0524 and a diameter of 49.19 kilometers based on an absolute magnitude of 10.36.

Naming 

This minor planet was likely named after Erna Bidschof, the granddaughter of Austrian astronomer Johann Palisa, who was one of the most prolific discoverer of minor planets at the time. Erna is the daughter of the astronomer Friedrich Bidschof (1864–1915) and his wife Helene (née Palisa).

References

External links 
 Asteroid Lightcurve Database (LCDB), query form (info )
 Dictionary of Minor Planet Names, Google books
 Asteroids and comets rotation curves, CdR – Observatoire de Genève, Raoul Behrend
 Discovery Circumstances: Numbered Minor Planets (1)-(5000) – Minor Planet Center
 
 

000406
Discoveries by Auguste Charlois
Named minor planets
000406
18950822